Sandviken RC is a Swedish rugby club in Sandviken. They currently play in the Mälardalsserien along with Uppsala RFC B.

History
The club was founded on 1 January 1983.

External links
Sandviken RC - Rugby - IdrottOnline Klubb

Swedish rugby union teams
Sport in Gävleborg County
Rugby clubs established in 1983